Dusri Biwi is a Pakistani drama serial directed by Anjum Shahzad, written by Samina Ejaz, and produced by the lead actor Fahad Mustafa and Dr. Ali Kazmi under a production banner called BigBangEntertainment.

The drama stars Fahad Mustafa, Hareem Farooq and Maha Warsi in the lead roles alongside Ahmed Ali, Shehryar Zaidi, Amber Khan, Maham, Fatima, Ali Kazmi and Zara Gull. The drama had its initial episode on 1 December 2014 on ARY Digital. During production of the drama they used the working title Poora Chand Adhoora Hai.

The show was also aired on Star Utsav in India.

Plot outline 
Dusri Biwi is a romantic love triangle. A hardworking man, Hassan (Fahad Mustafa), is living a happily married life with his wife Ayesha (Hareem Farooq) and their daughter Saman. That was until Hassan's colleague Farah (Maha Warsi) entered his life. Hassan and Farah became friends. One day Farah broke her engagement with Aamir. Hassan console Farah's dad(Amber Khan) and in that time Hassan promised him that he will marry Farah. Hassan gets married with Farah and on same night he got the news that Ayesha is pregnant with his second child. After some time Ayesha lost her child and Farah becomes pregnant with Hassan first child.

Although he was a loyal and a hard working husband, falling in love was their fate. But to get married was beyond their control and now the only common thing between both the women is their husband.

In season 2 of Dusri Biwi, Hassan marries another woman whom he meets while going on a business trip. Hassan again hides the truth from his first and second wife.

Cast 
 Fahad Mustafa as Hassan
 Hareem Farooq as Ayesha
 Maha Warsi as Farah
 Ahmed Ali Akbar as Aamir
 Shehriyar Zaidi as Farah's Father
 Amber Khan as Farah's Mother
 Maham Amir as Fouzia/Bajo
 Fatima (Childstar) as Saman
 Dr. Ali Kazmi as Ahmed
 Zara Gull as Ayesha's Sister In Law

Soundtrack 
The drama's soundtrack is composed and sung by Ahmed Jahanzaib.

Awards

Trivia 
 Fahad Mustafa announced that this drama would be his "last television commitment for some time".

References

External links 
 
 

Pakistani drama television series
Urdu-language television shows
2014 Pakistani television series debuts
2015 Pakistani television series endings
ARY Digital original programming
ARY Digital